Cottesmore may refer to:

Cottesmore, Rutland, England
Cottesmore Hunt, fox hunt, formerly kennelled in Cottesmore, Rutland
Cottesmore School, a prep school in Sussex, England
HMS Cottesmore, the name of three Royal Navy ships 
RAF Cottesmore, Royal Air Force station 
 Kendrew Barracks, the current use of the above station